was a Japanese author and kimono designer. She was known for her contributions to Japanese fashion, film, and literature.

Early years
Uno was born in Iwakuni, Yamaguchi. In 1915 she was fired from her job as a teacher's assistant due to an affair she was having with a colleague. She married her cousin, a banker named Fujimara Tadashi, in 1919. Following an initial literary success of winning of a prize for her short story Shifun no Kao, or Painted Face, in 1921, Uno left Tadashi and moved to Tokyo.

Like many young Japanese people of the 1920s, Uno was fascinated with American and European culture and dressing. In 1927 she was one of the first women in Japan to bob her hair like a flapper. Beyond hairstyles, Uno also began to pursue the life of a free-spirited woman. She became part of the Bohemian world of Tokyo, having liaisons with other writers, poets, and painters.

Career
In 1933, Uno started publishing the serialised novel , which brought her much fame. The novel details an artist and his various love affairs, and a suicide attempt with his mistress. Uno had a romance with Seiji Tōgō, the artist on whose biography the novel was based on, and then turned their involvement into a best-selling story. She also wrote convincingly from the perspective of a man in Confessions of Love, which further added to her book's appeal.

Shortly after the success of Confessions of Love, Uno started a magazine called , or Style in 1936, which was the first of its kind in Japan to focus on foreign fashions.  took up much of her time through the following decades until its bankruptcy in 1959.

Uno continued to write and to intrigue an audience of Japanese women, who found a sense of liberation in Uno's prose. Even if Uno's readers remained within conventional boundaries themselves, they could escape briefly through her stories of lovers and entanglements. Despite her femininity, from Confessions of Love throughout her literary career, Uno was able to write skillfully from both male and female perspectives.

Uno also became successful as a kimono designer, and along with her assistant designer Tomiyo Hanazawa, Uno traveled to the United States to stage the first kimono fashion show in the United States in 1957.

Later years
In later years, Uno's popularity was given formal status as she was recognized by the Emperor and assumed the honor of being one of Japan's oldest and most talented female writers. In 1983 she published the memoir , which was widely read and adapted for television. She was named a "person of cultural merit" in 1990.

She stated that the essence of her life was not to follow anyone else's rules and to have done as she pleased. Married often with varying success, Uno found it difficult to remain with just one man, and it was said that she would even move to a new house every time a major affair or marriage ended.

She died in 1996 at the age of 98 due to pneumonia.

Works 

 Confessions of Love, 1933-1935
 Ningyoshi Tenguya Kyukichi (The Puppet Master Tenguya Kyukichi), 1942
 Ohan, 1957
 Sasu (To Sting), 1964
 Kaze no Oto (The Sound of the Wind), 1969
 Kofuku (Blessings), 1970
 The Story of a Single Woman, 1972
 Mama no Hanashi (Mama-san's Story), 1976
 Cheri ga Shina (Cherry is Dead), 1976
 I Will Go On Living, 1983
 Ippen Harukaze ga Fuitekita (Suddenly a Spring Wind), 1987

Awards and honors
 1957, Noma Literary Prize

External links
 Prominent People of Minato City Chiyo Uno 
 Synopsis of Ohan at JLPP (Japanese Literature Publishing Project) 
 The Sound of the Wind: The Life and Works of Uno Chiyo. Rebecca L. Copeland (1992)

References 

1897 births
1996 deaths
20th-century Japanese writers
20th-century Japanese women writers
Writers from Yamaguchi Prefecture